Kyrylo is a Ukrainian male name of Ancient Greek origin.

It may also refer to:
Kyrylo Fesenko (born 1986), Ukrainian professional basketball player
Kyrylo Kryvoborodenko (born 1996), Ukrainian footballer 
Kyrylo Stetsenko (1882–1922), Ukrainian composer, conductor, critic, and teacher
Kyrylo Shevchenko (born 1972), Ukrainian banker and the Chairman of the National Bank of Ukraine 
Kyrylo Stavrovetsky or Stavrovetskyi (died 1646), Ruthenian (Ukrainian) church figure of the Polish–Lithuanian Commonwealth

See also 
 Cyril

Given names of Greek language origin
Ukrainian masculine given names